Pier Angelo Soldini (25 May 1910 – 12 July 1974) was an Italian novelist, essayist and journalist.

Born in Castelnuovo Scrivia, in 1935 Soldini won a special Viareggio Prize for best first work thanks to his debut novel Alghe e meduse. In 1937, he won the Bagutta Prize for the book Sole e bandiere.

Soldini collaborated as a journalist with various publications, and was editorial director of the publishing house Palazzi. He died on 12 July 1974 in Volpedo, where he was spending his holidays.

Further reading 

  Roberto Carlo Delconte. Tra giornalismo e letteratura. Pier Angelo Soldini (1910-2010) e la cultura del Novecento.  Comune di Castelnuovo Scrivia, 2011. .

References

 

1910 births
1974 deaths
People from Castelnuovo Scrivia
Italian essayists
Male essayists
Italian male journalists
Italian novelists
20th-century Italian writers
20th-century Italian male writers
Viareggio Prize winners
20th-century essayists
20th-century Italian journalists
Italian male non-fiction writers